The 2010–11 season of Hamburger SV began on 28 June with their first training session. Hamburg played its matches at Imtech Arena.

Hamburg hired Armin Veh as their new head coach after sacking Bruno Labbadia near the end of last season and appointed Bastian Reinhardt as their new sports director. Hamburg were interested in a number of big name players, including Rafinha of Schalke 04, Michael Ballack, who Chelsea deemed surplus, Serdar Tasci of VfB Stuttgart and Jaroslav Drobný. Out of all of those, only Drobný decided to sign with Hamburg. Jérôme Boateng was the only major player sold, leaving for Manchester City.

The signings continued during pre-season. Hamburg signed Dennis Diekmeier from 1. FC Nürnberg and Heiko Westermann from Schalke 04.

Season
In September 2010, Hamburger SV and FC St. Pauli played their first derby in eight years. The match ended in a 1–1 draw.

Hamburg club president Bernd Hoffmann had come under pressure for poor club results. Bernd Hoffmann came under pressure after Hamburg lost 4–2 to Bayer Leverkusen. A group of fans protested against recent results outside the club headquarters by demanding Bernd Hoffmann resignation. Head coach Armin Veh said Hoffmann should not be blamed and the coaching staff and the playing staff collectively should be blamed for the bad results. Supervisory board Horst Becker resigned on 13 December 2010 and stated that he would not seek re-election for the position.

Wigan Athletic contacted Hamburg about a possible loan move for Dutch winger Eljero Elia. Eljero Elia had fallen out of favour at Hamburg. Sporting director Bastian Reinhardt had confirmed that Wigan offered to take Elia on loan for half-a-season.

Ruud van Nistelrooy had confirmed that Real Madrid were interested in signing him. On 23 January 2011, Hamburg rejected a transfer worth more than €2 million plus a friendly match. President Hoffmann stated that Hamburg were looking to get back into Europe and it would be "impossible" to allow him to leave the club. It became publicly known that Ruud van Nistelrooy wasn't happy about Hamburg rejecting the transfer offer from Real Madrid and he has ruled out a contract extension with Hamburger SV.

In January 2011, Matthias Sammer rejected a job offer from Hamburg. The job would have been similar to the one he has with the German Football Association (DFB).

On 5 February 2011, Hamburg and St. Pauli fans fought each other after the match between the two clubs was postponed due to rain. Up to 200 hooligans threw bottles and fireworks at police. One person was arrested and 45 people taken into custody. The police had been expecting violence ahead of the derby. Police and stadium workers had discovered fireworks attached to seats in the stands of Imtech Arena in the days leading up to the originally scheduled match.

On 13 March 2011, the day after a 6–0 loss to Bayern Munich, Hamburg fired head coach Armin Veh and assistant coach Reiner Geyer. Michael Oenning was named interim head coach and Rudolfo Cardoso assistant coach. Originally, Veh was going to leave the club after the season.

Players

First-team squad
Squad at end of season

Left club during season

Competitions

Bundesliga

League table

Matches

DFB Cup

Transfers

In:

Out:

.

Statistics

Appearances and goals

Reference: Soccernet

|}

Coaching staff

Kits

References

Notes

German football clubs 2010–11 season
2010-11